Michael Brown (born 20 September 1976) is a former professional Australian rules footballer who played as a Centre half-forward for the Fremantle Football Club in the Australian Football League (AFL).

Originally from Western Australian Football League (WAFL) club Swan Districts, Brown was drafted by Fremantle in the 1995 Pre-Season draft. He made his senior AFL debut for Fremantle in Round 4 1996, against Collingwood at Victoria Park.

Brown played 22 games before he was delisted at the end of the 1998 AFL season.

External links

1976 births
Living people
Fremantle Football Club players
Swan Districts Football Club players
Australian rules footballers from Western Australia